Jacques Hardouin-Mansart de Sagonne (26 July 1711, Paris - 27 September 1778, Paris) was a French architect. He was the illegitimate son of Jacques Hardouin-Mansart, comte de Sagonne, by his mistress Madeleine Duguesny - Jacques and Madeleine married in 1726. Jacques junior's elder brother was the architect Jean Mansart de Jouy (1705-1783), whilst he was also the grandson of Jules Hardouin-Mansart, great-great-great nephew of François Mansart and great-nephew of Robert de Cotte.

External links
http://fr.structurae.de/persons/data/index.cfm?ID=d002995

18th-century French architects
Architects from Paris
1711 births
1778 deaths